The MV Maritime Queen (ex-Woody Heart) is a Bulk carrier  built in 1998.

References

1998 ships
Bulk carriers